This is a list of Spanish television related events in 1996.

Events 
 16 April: Corporate groups Correo and Prensa Española, later merged as Vocento purchase 25% share of Channel Telecinco, up to that time owned by ONCE.
 10 May: Mónica Ridruejo is appointed Director General of RTVE.
 15 May: Alejandro Echevarría is appointed  Chief executive officer of Telecinco.
 14 December: España wins the Festival de la OTI with the song En mis manos, by Anabel Russ.

Debuts

Television shows

Ending this year

Foreign series debuts in Spain

Births 
 26 January - María Pedraza, actress.
 21 February - Gloria Camila Ortega, pundit.
 25 April - Miguel Herrán, actor.
 4 July - Sofía Suescun, pundit.

Deaths 
 7 January - Daniel Vindel, host, 64.
 17 January - Pilar Trenas, journalist, 46.
 17 February - Herta Frankel, marionetista, 83.
 23 March - Irene Guerrero de Luna, actress de voz, 84.
 5 April - Encarna Sánchez, hostess, 60.
 2 May - María Luisa Ponte, actress, 77.
 9 June - Rafaela Aparicio, actress, 90.
 9 July - Aurora Redondo, actress, 96.
 18 July - Javier Escrivá, actor, 65.
 24 July - Nacho Martínez, actor, 44.
 2 September - José María Comesaña, journalist, 47.
 5 December - David Cubedo, host, 81.
 27 December - Julián Mateos, actor, 58.

See also
 1996 in Spain
 List of Spanish films of 1996

References 

1996 in Spanish television